William Randall Davis Jr. (born May 29, 1984) is an American college baseball coach and former catcher. Davis is the head coach of the Lamar Cardinals baseball team. Davis is the son of former college baseball coach Randy Davis who was an assistant coach at UL-Monroe, LSU, and South Carolina and the head coach at Louisiana Tech. The elder Davis died in February 2022. Will Davis is married to the former Danielle Hall of Bogalusa, Louisiana. She is a former cheerleader for the New Orleans Saints. The couple have three children Everly (2016), Coco (2020), and Crash (2022).

Playing career
Davis attended Robert E. Lee High School (now Liberty Magnet High School) in Baton Rouge, Louisiana. Davis played for the school's varsity baseball team. Davis then enrolled at Louisiana State University, to play college baseball for the LSU Tigers baseball team.

Davis was a letterman on the 2004 College World Series team and a two-time SEC Academic Honor Roll selection.

Coaching career
Davis began his coaching career in 2008 as the coordinator of baseball operations at LSU. In 2009, Davis was promoted to assistant coach. The Tigers won the 2009 College World Series. Davis quickly developed a reputation as a strong on-field coach and aggressive recruiter, particularly in his home state of Louisiana. 

On January 15, 2016, Davis was the head coach in waiting of the Lamar Cardinals baseball program. In 2016 Davis spent the season at Lamar while serving as head coach in waiting and at times the acting head coach. The Cardinals went 35-19 defeating national powers Texas, Arizona, and LSU. 

Davis was tasked with re-stocking a roster that had missed the 2015 and 2016 recruiting classes due to the retirement announcement and subsequent retirement of long-time Cardinals coach Jim Gilligan. With 13 seniors remaining from Gilligan's last year but no other classes in the program Davis was able to sign future MLB draft picks Carson Lance and Tanner Driskill late and put together a 33-25 season in his first campaign as head coach. 

With the 13-man senior class leaving, Davis methodically built the program back up by bringing in nationally ranked recruiting classes for the first time in school history. The 2017 class was ranked #73 in the nation by Perfect Game (#1 in the Southland Conference while the 2018 class was ranked #92 nationally and #2 in the Southland. As the young players began to develop, Davis switched his recruiting approach to supplementing the program with older junior college players and received national rankings by the JUCO Baseball Blog of #22 in 2020 and #7 in 2021.

In 2021 the rebuild was complete with the Cardinals having a winning season and reaching the postseason for the first time since 2017.

The 2022 Lamar Cardinals enjoyed their best season in roughly a decade going 37-21 with a 20-10 record in the WAC good enough for a 2nd place finish. The Cardinals enjoyed wins over perennial powers Rice (twice), Houston, and eventual national runner-up Oklahoma.

Head coaching record

See also
 List of current NCAA Division I baseball coaches

References

External links
LSU Tigers bio
Lamar Cardinals bio

Living people
1984 births
Baseball catchers
LSU Tigers baseball players
LSU Tigers baseball coaches
Lamar Cardinals baseball coaches
Baseball coaches from Louisiana
Sportspeople from Baton Rouge, Louisiana